Keith J. Krach (born April 1, 1957) is an American businessman, and former diplomat. He is the former chairman and CEO of DocuSign. Krach co-founded Ariba, and was chairman and CEO, and is recognized for his work in B2B Commerce and Digital Transaction Management. Krach was chairman of the board of Angie’s List. Krach was the youngest-ever Vice President of General Motors. He was Chairman of the board of Trustees for Purdue University.

On June 20, 2019, he was confirmed by the Senate to become Under Secretary of State for Economic Growth, Energy, and the Environment in the Trump administration. He was succeeded by acting senior official Marcia Bernicat.

Early life and education
Krach was born in Lakewood, Ohio, to Elda and John Krach, and was raised in the small town of Rocky River, Ohio. Krach says that his first and most important mentors were his parents. Krach's father was “the best leader I’ve ever known in my life. He certainly modeled one heck of a work ethic,” said Krach in a 2017 interview.

At the age of 12, Krach worked as a welder in his father's machine shop, an experience which inspired him to pursue a B.S. in industrial engineering from Purdue University. During his sophomore year (1977),  Krach received one of two General Motors scholarships awarded to Purdue engineering students. The scholarship paid for tuition, books, a living stipend, summer jobs with the automaker, and a full-time position with the company in Detroit following graduation.

After graduating from Purdue in 1979, Krach received a fellowship which also included half salary from General Motors to study for an M.B.A. from Harvard University Business School. Upon completion of his master's degree in 1981, he joined GM full time.

Business career

GM and other ventures

Krach began his career at General Motors where he worked at GM's Cadillac Division and Technical Center in Detroit, Michigan and the New York Treasurer's Office under Rick Wagoner. He was named GM's youngest-ever vice president, at 26, in 1984.  He was one of the founders of GMF Robotics, a joint venture between GM and Fanuc Robotics, which became the largest provider of industrial robots in the world.

Silicon Valley
Krach left GM and took a job at startup software company Qronos. He joined Qronos as its number 2 executive in 1987 but left after nine months over what he called a conflict over values with the CEO.

In 1988 Krach became a member of the founding team of `Rasna Corporation, a mechanical engineering design software company that was sold to PTC for $500 million in 1995. In 1996, Krach was the first entrepreneur in residence at Benchmark Capital, and in 2008, he became a Benchmark CEO in residence.

Ariba
From 1996 to 2003, Krach served as co-founder, chairman, and CEO of business-to-business e-commerce company Ariba, creating the world’s largest business network transacting $3.75 trillion in commerce annually. In 1999, Krach took Ariba public on Nasdaq, with an initial valuation of $6 billion, which grew to $40 billion by 2000, making it one of the first internet software companies to go public.

In 2000, Krach led the $400 million acquisition of online business auction company Trading Dynamics Inc., and the $1.4 billion acquisition of Tradex software maker for building online communities of buyers and sellers.

DocuSign

In 2009, Krach became the chairman and in 2011 the CEO of DocuSign, a technology company which provides electronic signature and digital transaction management solutions. As CEO, Krach led the creation of the Digital Transaction Management category and the building of the DocuSign Global Trust Network which comprises more than 320,000 companies and 400 million users in 188 countries.

He led efforts to secure strategic investments and support from major companies such as SAP, Google, Salesforce, Visa, Dell, Intel, Samsung, NTT, Mitsui, Telstra, Comcast, FedEx, Deutsche Telekom, and the nation of Singapore.

In January 2017, Krach named his successor as CEO of DocuSign, with his tenure as chairman ending in January 2019. He received a 97% CEO rating on Glassdoor.

DocuSign filed for its IPO in April 2018.  As of that date, Krach was the largest individual shareholder unaffiliated with a venture firm.

In an interview with Inside Philanthropy, Krach signaled his intention to focus more on philanthropy upon stepping down as DocuSign chairman.

Board memberships and other roles
From 2006 to 2009, Krach served on the board of directors of XOJet, and from 2007 to 2011, on the board of Ooma.

From 2005 to 2011, Krach served as CEO of 3Points, an investment holding company based in Los Gatos, California.

Additionally, Krach served as board chairman of Angie's List from 2011 to 2014. The company went public in 2011.

Krach has taken on recent initiatives to accelerate “digital transformations” on a national and global front. In 2017, he was named to the NYCx Technology Leadership Advisory Council, a diverse group of technology and community leaders selected by New York City's Mayor, Bill de Blasio.

Krach is the founder of the Global Mentor Network. The organization connects young people with industry leaders through a video-based platform piloted in 2018 with retired four-star General Stanley McChrystal, former NASA Administrator Dan Goldin, City Year Founder Michael Brown, and former Deutsche Bank COO Kim Hammonds.

Awards and recognition
In 1998, Krach was named a top 10 entrepreneur of the year by Red Herring Magazine. In 2000, he received the Technology Pioneer award at the World Economic Forum, in Davos, Switzerland. That same year, he was recognized as one of the top 10 tech execs by Forbes. In 2000 and again in 2015, Krach was named National Entrepreneur of the Year by Ernst & Young. Krach earned the Distinguished Engineer Alumni award from Purdue University in 2006, and in 2012 received the Alumni Achievement award from the National College Senior Honor Society. In 2014, Business Insider recognized him as one of the 50 most powerful people in enterprise tech, and the following year, the San Francisco Business Times recognized him as the most admired CEO. Krach was also awarded a Dell Founder 50 award in 2015. In 2018, Krach received the Life & News 2018 Transformational Leader of the Year award and in 2019 Harvard Business School's 2019 Business Leader of the Year award.

He also received an honorary doctorate from Ohio Northern University in 2015 in Business Administration.

In October 2018, City Year San Jose/Silicon Valley honored Keith and Metta Krach with the City Year Citizen Leadership Award for their service to the Bay Area community and to the organization. The Krach family has given back to the organization through grants, product contributions, and event participation to support shared interest in education, mentorship, and leadership, and this recognition was the first time the organization has honored a couple with the award.

In 2019, Krach was awarded a lifetime achievement award by the Silicon Valley Leadership Group, a non-profit advocacy group that represents more than 390 Silicon Valley firms.

Higher education

In 2005, Sigma Chi Fraternity named Krach its 64th international president.  He served through 2007.  The fraternity also awarded him the 1979 International Balfour Award, which is given to the outstanding graduating senior fraternity wide.

Upon his election as the 64th Grand Consul, Krach unveiled the 150th anniversary strategic plan that pivoted the vision of the 350,000-member association to become the preeminent collegiate leadership development organization, with the sole mission of the development of values-based leaders, committed to the betterment of character, campus and community.

During his six-year term as Chairman of the Sigma Chi Leadership Training Board, he led the development and launch of Horizons Leadership Summit in Snowbird, Utah and secured funding from the L.G. Balfour Foundation to endow Leadership Training Workshop in 1997.

In 2019, Sigma Chi's main leadership training event was renamed the Krach Transformational Leaders Workshop, fulfilling his vision of developing transformational leaders in an annual immersion program for over 1,500 undergraduates from 240 universities. Participants engage in a series of mentoring sessions, strategic planning exercises, and experiential learning modules which can earn college credit or leadership certificates.

Krach has been honored with Sigma Chi's Significant Sig Award, and the Order of Constantine Award.

Indiana governor Mitch Daniels appointed Krach to the Purdue board of trustees in 2007 and he served as board chairman from 2009 to 2013. In 2012, he recruited Daniels to be the 12th president of the university.  During Krach's tenure, Purdue froze tuition and saw record research funding and philanthropic giving of more than $1 billion.

Krach currently serves on the Engineering Leadership Council (ELC).

Krach received an honorary doctorate in industrial engineering from Purdue University in 2018 in recognition for his accomplishments as an entrepreneur, early pioneer in robotics, and as chairman of the board of trustees.

Philanthropy

Krach is the chairman of the DocuSign IMPACT Foundation, DocuSign's philanthropic entity. He established the $30 Million DocuSign IMPACT Foundation with a mission to transform recipient entities by using DocuSign technology to streamline operations and make them more efficient. This nonprofit foundation provides a 1-for-1 match for DocuSign's employees for nonprofit entities such as the Special Olympics, Team Rubicon, Techbridge Girls, Free The Children, and New Story. Krach serves as Advisory Board Chairman for New Story, which, among other causes, provided disaster relief initiative for Haiti after Hurricane Matthew in 2016.

Krach gave a $1 million gift to City Year for the organization's San Jose and Silicon Valley branch to reach about 1,000 students at 12 elementary and middle schools through after-school programs focused on teaching science, technology, engineering, and math. The grant also funds a team of school-based AmeriCorps members, including opportunities for professional development.

Krach co-founded the Children's Autistic Network and served on the board of governors for Opportunity International.

In August 2018, Krach made an endowment-level gift to the Sigma Chi Foundation that will establish the Krach Transformational Leaders Workshop. This will replace the Balfour Leadership Training Workshop as the largest leadership training event in the Greek-letter fraternal world.

Through the Krach Family Foundation, he funded the Keith Krach leadership scholarship at Purdue University. It has been awarded to five students each year since 2009. In 2014, Purdue dedicated the Krach Leadership Center to him.

Author, speaker, and lecturer

Krach is a frequent contributing writer for Forbes, Entrepreneur, and the World Economic Forum on various topics. He has written about global economic security issues in the Wall Street Journal, Newsweek, The Hill, Washington Examiner, Jamaica Observer, The Daily Telegraph (UK), OGlobo (Brazil), and other publications. Krach has lectured on business strategy, technology and building high performance teams at Harvard, Stanford, Berkeley, and IMD business school in Switzerland.

Government service

On June 20, 2019, Krach was confirmed by the Senate as Under Secretary of State for Economic Growth, Energy, and the Environment, United States Alternate Governor of the European Bank for Reconstruction and Development, and United States Alternate Governor of the International Bank for Reconstruction and Development.

He served as the country's top economic diplomat for the State Department. The position is commonly referred to as the “E” within the department. Krach developed and operationalized the US global economic security strategy that focused on: driving economic growth, maximizing national security, and addressing the China challenge. To accomplish these tasks, the plan was based on three pillars: US economic competitiveness through tech innovation, safeguarding America’s assets, and building a network of trusted partners.

His responsibilities included international trade and investment policy; international finance, development, and debt policy; economic sanctions and combating terrorist financing; international energy security policy; international telecommunications and transportation policies; support for U.S. businesses, and economic policy analysis, public diplomacy, and private sector outreach.

He was also charged with advancing the State Department's economic development agenda; elevating and intensifying the Department's efforts related to energy security, clean energy, and environmental sustainability; and fostering innovation through robust science, entrepreneurship, and technology policies. He covered issues ranging from space to the oceans, with the goal of advancing U.S. strategic interests through policy aimed at ensuring that economic growth and a healthy planet go hand in hand.

His stated mission was to lead economic statecraft initiatives to enhance economic growth, energy security and the health of the planet, in order maximize national security and advance the interests of United States citizens.  Several bureaus and offices fell within the purview of the E family, including the Bureau of Economic and Business Affairs, the Bureau of Energy Resources, the Bureau of Oceans and International Environmental and Scientific Affairs, the Office of the Chief Economist and the Office of the Science & Technology Adviser.

Krach served as United States Alternate Governor of The European Bank for Reconstruction and Development; United States Alternate Governor of the International Bank for Reconstruction and Development; and United States Alternate Governor of the Inter-American Development Bank. The Under Secretary was the designated Ombudsperson for the U.S.-EU and U.S.-Swiss Privacy Shield Frameworks.

Nomination and confirmation

In Krach's testimony before the Senate Foreign Relations Committee, he stated that as head of economic diplomacy, his focus would be on embracing this opportunity and harnessing three areas of competitive advantage: strengthening our partnerships with friends and allies, leveraging the innovation and resources of the private sector, and amplifying the moral high ground of our American values and enduring optimism to advance peace and prosperity for our country and for the world.

Democratic Senator Ben Cardin said Krach's testimony was "impressive." Krach was confirmed by unanimous voice vote in the Senate.

Pandemic response 
In the spring and summer of 2020, Krach and his State Department team supported efforts to repatriate more than 60,000 Americans who were stranded overseas by the coronavirus pandemic, and also worked to accelerate supply chains for PPE and other vital supplies to safeguard the lives of healthcare workers, patients, and American families.

In March 2020, an article was published by Bloomberg, stating that Krach had made a billion dollars as a result of a runup in DocuSign's stock price, stating that Krach "benefited from a pandemic that's left millions of Americans unemployed." Bloomberg retracted the article and published a letter to the editor from Krach titled "Public Service Is Worth More Than a Billion." In his letter, Krach pointed out that "I divested my entire stake in DocuSign and my other holdings as a condition of joining the federal government, meaning I profited in no way."

He claimed the misstatement jeopardized the mission and credibility of his worldwide team as they were responded to the myriad issues spawned by the pandemic and had the potential to undermine the work of thousands of civil servants and foreign service officers by undercutting their ability to operate with the trust necessary to accomplish the mission.

Congress 
Krach advanced bipartisan legislation before Congress. He and his team developed the concept and worked with Senator Todd Young (R-Ind.) and Senate Democratic Leader Chuck Schumer (D-N.Y.) on the $100 billion technology research funding bill called the Endless Frontier Act (S.3832) to give the United States more resources to compete in the tech economy.

They also developed and championed with U.S. Senators John Cornyn (R-TX) and Mark Warner (D-VA) the CHIPS for America Act (S. 3933) for securing the technological future which would ensure the next generation of semiconductors are made in US instead of china by onshoring for semiconductor companies like TSMC.

Because Krach developed Global Economic Security Strategy, he worked closely with Senators Marco Rubio (R-FL), Todd Young (R-IN), Jeff Merkley (D-OR), and Chris Coons (D-DE), to produce the bill called the Global Economic Security Strategy of 2019 Act (S.2826) which creates a statutory requirement for future administrations to produce a Global Economic Security Strategy (GESS) and submit it to Congress. The goal would be to promote free and fair economic relationships between the United States and foreign countries.

During the pandemic, Krach led State Department's efforts to accelerate efforts to reduce supply chain dependency away from China and move production onshore for critical technologies. Krach focused on semiconductors. Because Taiwan's semiconductor industry accounts for roughly 70% of the world's production of sophisticated chips that play a critical role in 5G networks and military hardware, he held in depth discussions with Taiwanese government officials and several Taiwanese companies including the leader, Taiwan Semiconductor Manufacturing Company (TSMC). This led to the May 14, 2020 announcement of the largest onshoring in US history: TSMC's plan to build a $12 billion 5 nanometer semiconductor fab in the United States. TSMC represented the largest onshoring in US history and ensures U.S. domestic production of chips that were formerly available only from a location with significant political and potential military intervention risks.

Taiwan relationship 
On September 17, 2020, Krach was the first Under Secretary to visit Taiwan since the United States stopped recognizing the government in Taipei (replacing it instead in favor of the government in Beijing). Krach attended the funeral of former Taiwanese President Lee Teng-hui, and met with President Tsai, and led the development of an economic collaboration agreement which he named the Lee Economic Prosperity Partnership ("EPP") after Taiwan’s "Father of Democracy," former President Lee Teng-hui. A five-year agreement was signed on November 20, 2020. Krach strengthened the U.S.-Taiwan relationship by bolstering support and developing strategies for countering CCP "aggression" with the countries that still recognize Taiwan. The State Department stated that "future EPP Dialoges will strengthen the U.S.-Taiwan economic relationship." Krach also initiated and presided over a U.S.-Taiwan Science and Technology Cooperation Agreement, signed on December 15, 2020. Krach's team and the State Department also established the first step of the TIFA trade agreement in January 2021. The PRC Ministry of Foreign Affairs condemned the U.S for sending Under Secretary of State Keith Krach to Taiwan. The People’s Republic of China government in Beijing viewed the trip as a provocation by the United States because Krach was attending the memorial service for former President Lee Teng-hui, who had advocated for international recognition of Taiwan.  The presence of Under Secretary Krach was perceived as a break in the former U.S. policy of not antagonizing Beijing. In response to Krach's visit, the government in Beijing sent 40 Chinese fighters and bombers on “show of force” missions across the median line of the Taiwan Strait.  The US simultaneously announced a $7 billion arms deal with Taiwan, including sea mines, drones and air-to-surface missiles. Der Spiegel reported that "the timing was hardly chosen by chance."

On January 20, 2021, China imposed sanctions against Krach, outgoing US Secretary of State Mike Pompeo, former secretary of health and human services Alex Azar, outgoing US ambassador to the United Nations Kelly Craft, and 24 other former Trump officials. Biden's National Security Council called the sanctions "unproductive and cynical."

The Clean Network 
Undersecretary of State Krach was responsible for the development and implementation of the Clean Network Alliance of Democracies which is designed to be a US government-led global effort  to address what the State Department describes as "the long-term threat to data privacy, security, human rights and principled collaboration posed to the free world from authoritarian malign actors." Krach coined the term "The Clean Network" to describe what he described in his Senate confirmation hearing as an alliance of democracies and companies that operate by a set of trust principles.

The first goal was to secure citizens' personal information, companies' intellectual property and countries' most sensitive information that may be transmitted over Chinese-made "5G" networking equipment used by telecommunications operators. According to the United States, companies like Huawei Technologies and ZTE Corporation are bound by Chinese national intelligence laws that require any Chinese company to turn over any information, intellectual property or data to the Chinese Communist Party upon request.

On May 15, 2020, The Clean Network commenced with three simultaneous announcements of three related initiatives to put Huawei on the defensive and dubbed the 5G Trifecta; the onshoring of TSMC’s semiconductors, the tightening of export controls on Huawei; and the global roll out of the 5G Clean Path.

Krach changed the approach of “pounding on the table” from prior US government officials to treating "countries like customers." He also met repeatedly with the telecommunications companies to create a tipping point of support for using only "trusted vendors."  According to Bloomberg Krach's strategy was a notable change in tone after years in which the administration pursued a go-it-alone, "America First" strategy.

Krach had a global campaign that included trips to Asia, Europe, the Middle East, and Latin America.

On August 5, 2020, the Clean Network effort expanded with five additional lines of effort: Clean Carrier, Clean Store, Clean Apps, Clean Cable and Clean Cloud. Alibaba, Baidu, China Mobile, China Telecom, and Tencent were named as threats to be countered.

Krach secured commitments to the Clean Network from other EU countries, such as Estonia, Albania, Austria, Germany, Luxembourg, Belgium, Spain, Portugal, Bulgaria, Kosovo, North Macedonia, and Cyprus. By the end of October 2020, the Clean Network grew to 49 country members, representing two thirds of global GDP, and over 100 Clean Telcos. This includes 26 of 27 EU nations, 27 of 30 NATO members, and 11 of 12 Three Seas countries. In December 2020 and January 2021 Krach onboarded countries including Palau, Ukraine and Georgia.  The alliance also includes other countries such as Japan, Israel, Australia, Singapore, Taiwan, Canada, Vietnam, India, and companies like Oracle, HP, Reliance Jio, NEC, Fujitsu, Cisco, Siemens, Softbank, and VMware.  Following Krach's Clean Network agreements, Huawei's 5G telecom deals outside of China decreased from 91 to 12, with the Wall Street Journal noting that "The Clean Network has become an undisputed success." Politico deemed the Clean Network strategy unlikely to change in the Biden administration.

Capital markets 
Krach led the State Department's efforts to protect American investors from unknowingly financing what he described as the People's Republic of China's  military, security, intelligence apparatus and, human rights abuses. He did so by urging U.S. businesses and investment vehicles to disclose Chinese assets and divest Chinese stocks participating in human rights violations.  He stated that most Americans have no idea that their own money funds these Chinese companies. He further asserted that through a web of subsidiaries, index funds, financial products and lack of proper disclosure, the average American investor is forced to support Chinese companies in their pension funds, 401Ks, brokerage accounts, charitable and university endowments.

On July 1, 2020, Krach sent a letter to all U.S. CEOs and businesses, asserting their duty to establish governance principles when it comes to investing in entities that directly or indirectly facilitate human rights abuses and Chinese military buildup. On August 18, 2020, Krach also sent a letter  to the governing boards of American universities, alerting them to the threats posed to university endowments by Chinese Communist Party companies on the entity list or that contribute to human rights violations, stating "divesting would be prudent in the likely outcome that enhanced listing standards lead to a wholesale delisting of PRC firms from U.S. exchanges. He also urged them to consider publicly disclosing all Chinese company holdings to their campus communities.

On December 8, 2020, in an effort to warn pension holders, Krach issued a U.S. Department of State fact sheet titled "US Investors Are Funding Malign PRC Companies on Major Indices," which listed 13 PRC firms on the  Commerce Department’s Entity List, 35 parent-level Communist Chinese Military Companies (CCMCs), and 71 affiliates on the  Department of Defense’s List of CCMCs that are included in various U.S. equity indexes.

On January 7, 2021, The New York Stock Exchange announced the delisting of three major Chinese telecommunications firms. China Telecom Corp. shares dropped 9.4% and China Mobile Ltd. fell 7.2%, closing at their lowest prices since 2008 and 2006 respectively. China Unicom’s stock slid 11%. Bloomberg noted, "As far back as August, a senior State Department official, Keith Krach, wrote a letter warning universities to divest from Chinese firms ahead of possible delistings."

On January 14, 2021, Krach cautioned financial institutions by holding a press conference and issuing a U.S. Department of State fact sheet titled "Communist Chinese Military Companies Listed Under E.O. 13959 Have More Than 1,100 Subsidiaries" expanding the list to 44 parent-level CCMCs, and 1,108 subsidiaries cross referenced to MSCI’s and FTSE’s major indexes that are prohibited for US investment and require divestment. Krach stressed that ample notice have been given to compliance officers and risk managers about disclosing the material risk associated to their constituents. Krach recommended to the next administration that it harmonize the various agency lists for continuity of policy with regard to aligning the Defense Department list of CCMCs with the Commerce Department Entity List, and the Military End User list. On January 18, 2021, Krach sent a letter to the leaders of all civil society organizations stressing the importance of clean portfolios with clean funds and urging them to partner only with organizations that are not financing what he described as the CCP’s "egregious" behavior. Krach stated that by combining their actions across the public, business, and education sectors and uniting under the global Clean Network Alliance of Democracies, it creates a "network effect" that he said "has the power to be an exponential force for good secure the free world against rising authoritarianism."

Krach and Ellie Cohanim, U.S. Deputy Special Envoy to Combat Anti-Semitism, penned a Newsweek op-ed comparing genocide in Xinjiang with that of the Holocaust and urging citizens to divest from Chinese stocks involved with human rights abuses. The op-ed also called out the World Economic Forum, the ESG community and Blackrock for being silent on the CCP's genocide.

The Trust Principle Doctrine 

Krach’s "Trust Principle" doctrine serves as a new basis for 21st century international relations and as a peaceful alternative to China’s “Power Principle,” of intimidation, retaliation, coercion, and retribution. The ‘Trust Principle’ is based on democratic values which includes respect for the rule of law, property, press, human rights, and national sovereignty, protection of labor and the environment, and standards for transparency, integrity, and reciprocity.

During the pandemic, Under Secretary Krach deployed the “Trust Principle” doctrine building the Clean Network Alliance of Democracies to protect global 5G infrastructure and creating a useable model for overcoming authoritarian economic threats.  Leon Panetta, the Secretary of Defense under President Barack Obama said, “The Clean Network pioneered a trust-based model for countering authoritarian aggression across all areas of techno-economic competition.”  

Krach also used the “Trust Principle” as a catalyst for developing stronger U.S.-Taiwan relations and supporting Taiwan’s independence. It was instrumental in leading the US to formally recognizing PRC’s “state-sponsored genocide” after Krach’s Fourth of July 2020 television appearance when he became the first U.S. diplomat to publicly label China’s treatment of the Uyghurs “genocide.”

2022 Nobel Peace Prize nomination 
Krach's former colleague at the State Department Miles Yu nominated Krach for the 2022 Nobel Peace Prize for his Trust Principle doctrine in developing the Clean Network Alliance of Democracies to defend against technological authoritarianism, protect economic security, preserve democracy in Taiwan, and protect human rights. Any national lawmaker, university professor, and members of certain boards can make a nomination.
Yu's nomination stated, “Peaceful partnership, not fear mongering. That is the stark choice that Keith Krach has enabled through his years-long campaign and mission to unify the world around a common, peaceful technology accord, formally recognized today as the Clean Network alliance. Keith Krach’s attendant efforts regarding human rights abuses by China and Taiwan’s quest for independence are, in many ways, just different colors in the same noble cause that Mr. Krach pursues as a life purpose. The world truly is a better and safer place because of his courage and efforts.”

Personal life 

Krach lives in San Francisco, California. He is married to Metta Krach, former senior corporate counsel at Gap Inc., current member of the board of visitors for Georgetown Law School, board of governors for the San Francisco Symphony, and current member of the executive committee of the board of trustees for the Bay Area Discovery Museum. They have five children.

In 2015, Krach successfully caught a thief who had taken his iPhone from his hands. As he chased the thief, he was spotted by police officers, who eventually apprehended the thief. Upon confirming Krach's identity, they provided him with a “legal loophole,” which enabled him to recover his phone sooner, rather than having it impounded as evidence. Krach claimed the officers had recently used DocuSign and shared their positive experiences with him.

References

External links
 Keith J. Krach website

1957 births
Living people
Harvard Business School alumni
Purdue University College of Engineering alumni
American philanthropists
American technology chief executives
Trump administration personnel
United States Under Secretaries of State